Constantinos C. Markides (born 1960) is a Cypriot management educator and, since 1990, the Robert P. Bauman Professor of Strategic Leadership at London Business School (London, UK). He is known for his work on strategic disruption and business models which is particularly illustrated in his book Game Changing Strategies published in 2008. He was listed among the Forbes.com list of Most Influential Management Gurus (2009).

Life and work 
A native of Cyprus, he received a BA (Distinction) and MA in Economics from Boston University, MBA and DBA from the Harvard Business School.

Constantinos worked as a research associate at the Harvard Business School and has completed research and published on the topics of international competitiveness, corporate restructuring, refocusing and international acquisitions (in journals such as the Harvard Business Review, MIT Sloan Management Review, Directors & Boards, Long range planning, British Journal of Management, Journal of International Business Studies, Strategic Management Journal and the Academy of Management Journal.)

He is on the Editorial Board of the Strategic Management Journal and the MIT Sloan Management Review. Constantinos was also a Fellow of the World Economic Forum in Davos.

Selected works
1995. Diversification, Refocusing and Economic Performance. MIT Press
2000. All the Right Moves: A Guide to Crafting Breakthrough Strategy. Harvard Business School Press 
2004 (with Paul Geroski). Fast second: How smart companies bypass radical innovation to enter and conquer new markets. Jossey-Bass 
2008. Game-Changing Strategies: How to Create New Market Space in Established Industries by Breaking the Rules. Jossey-Bass

References

Academics of London Business School
Cypriot business theorists
Boston University College of Arts and Sciences alumni
Cypriot academics
Cypriot social scientists
Harvard Business School alumni
Living people
1960 births
Management scientists